Bahrain competed at the 2004 Summer Paralympics in Athens, Greece. The team included five athletes, all of whom were men. Ahmed Meshaima won the nation's only medal at the Games, a silver in the men's shot put F37.

Medallists

Sports

Athletics

Men's field

Powerlifting

Men

See also
Bahrain at the Paralympics
Bahrain at the 2004 Summer Olympics

References 

Nations at the 2004 Summer Paralympics
2004
Summer Paralympics